Scopula mecysma is a moth of the family Geometridae first described by Charles Swinhoe in 1894. It is found in the Himalaya, Taiwan, Thailand and on Borneo, Java, Bali, Sulawesi and New Guinea. The habitat consists of lowland forests.

Subspecies
Scopula mecysma mecysma (north-eastern Himalaya, Taiwan, Thailand)
Scopula mecysma mesites L. B. Prout, 1935 (Borneo, Java, Bali, Sulawesi, New Guinea)

References

Moths described in 1894
mecysma
Moths of Asia